Amauropelta fluminalis, synonym Thelypteris fluminalis, is a species of fern in the family Thelypteridaceae. It is native to Colombia and Ecuador. Its natural habitats are subtropical or tropical moist lowland forests and rivers. It is threatened by habitat loss.

References

 

Thelypteridaceae
Flora of Colombia
Flora of Ecuador
Near threatened flora of South America
Taxonomy articles created by Polbot
Taxobox binomials not recognized by IUCN